Kurau may refer to:

Kurau Phantom Memory, a 2004 science fiction anime series
Kurau, Budaun, a village in Budaun district, Uttar Pradesh, India
Kuala Kurau, a mukim in Perak, Malaysia
Kuala Kurau (state constituency), a state constituency in Perak, Malaysia
Batu Kurau (state constituency), a state constituency in Perak, Malaysia
Johann Walter-Kurau, a Latvian painter
Peter Kurau, Professor of Horn and Chamber Music at the Eastman School of Music
Tenchi wo Kurau, a manga by Hiroshi Motomiya
Telok Kurau Secondary School, a co-educational international secondary school in Bedok, Singapore
Tenchi wo Kurau II, a role-playing game released in Japan